Jerald Hawkins (born October 16, 1993) is an American football offensive tackle who is currently a member of the Saskatchewan Roughriders of the Canadian Football League (CFL). He played college football at Louisiana State University. He was drafted by the Steelers in the fourth round of the 2016 NFL Draft. He has also played for the Tampa Bay Buccaneers and Houston Texans, and has been a member of the New England Patriots and New Orleans Saints.

Early years
Hawkins attended West St. Mary High School in Baldwin, Louisiana. He played both offensive and defensive tackle. He committed to Louisiana State University (LSU) to play college football.

College career
Hawkins was a three-year starter at offensive tackle for LSU from 2013 to 2015. He started at right tackle his first two years before switching to left for his junior year. After his junior year he entered the 2016 NFL Draft.

Professional career
Entering the 2016 NFL Draft, Hawkins was projected by the majority of NFL analysts and scouts to be a second or third round pick. He received the invitation to the NFL Combine and completed all the required combine drills and positional drills. On March 14, 2016, he participated at LSU's pro day and chose to only perform the three-cone drill and positional drills for team representatives and scouts. He was ranked the ninth best offensive tackle prospect available in the draft by NFLDraftScout.com.

Pittsburgh Steelers
Hawkins was drafted by the Pittsburgh Steelers in the fourth round (123rd overall) of the 2016 NFL Draft. On June 2, 2016, Hawkins signed a four-year, $2.87 million contract with a signing bonus of $530,488. On August 28, 2016, he was placed on injured reserve by the Steelers after suffering a shoulder injury during a joint practice with the Detroit Lions.

He entered training camp in  competing for a backup offensive tackle position with Matt Feiler, Chris Hubbard, and Keavon Milton. Hawkins was named the backup left tackle behind Alejandro Villanueva to begin the regular season.

On November 26, 2017, Hawkins made his professional debut against the Green Bay Packers.

On May 30, 2018, Hawkins suffered a torn quad during organized team activities. He was officially placed on injured reserve on June 5, 2018, ruling him out for the 2018 season.

Tampa Bay Buccaneers
On August 31, 2019, Hawkins was traded to the Tampa Bay Buccaneers along with the Steelers' seventh round pick in the 2021 NFL Draft in exchange for the Buccaneers' sixth round pick in the 2021 draft.

Houston Texans
On August 10, 2020, Hawkins was signed by the Houston Texans. He was released on September 5, 2020, and signed to the practice squad the next day.

Pittsburgh Steelers (II)
On September 16, 2020, Hawkins was signed away from the Texans' practice squad by the Steelers after Pittsburgh's starting right tackle Zach Banner suffered a season-ending ACL injury in Week 1. Hawkins was placed on the reserve/COVID-19 list by the Steelers on November 10, 2020, and activated on November 14. He was placed back on the COVID-19 list on November 27, and activated on December 7.

New England Patriots
On July 30, 2021, Hawkins signed with the New England Patriots. He was released on August 16.

New Orleans Saints
On December 8, 2021, Hawkins was signed to the New Orleans Saints practice squad. He signed a reserve/future contract with the Saints on January 11, 2022. He was placed on injured reserve on August 6, 2022. He was released on August 24.

Saskatchewan Roughriders 
On December 8, 2022, Hawkins signed with the Saskatchewan Roughriders of the Canadian Football League (CFL).

References

External links
 LSU Tigers bio

1993 births
Living people
Players of American football from Louisiana
American football offensive tackles
LSU Tigers football players
Pittsburgh Steelers players
People from Baldwin, Louisiana
Tampa Bay Buccaneers players
Houston Texans players
New England Patriots players
New Orleans Saints players